Bluespec, Inc. is a semiconductor tool design company co-founded by Professor Arvind of MIT in June 2003. Arvind had previously founded Sandburst in 2000, which specialized in producing chips for 10G-bit Ethernet routers; for this task, 

Bluespec has two product lines. Primarily for ASIC and FPGA hardware designers and architects, Bluespec supplies high-level synthesis (ESL logic synthesis) with RTL. The first Bluespec workshop was held on August 13, 2007, at MIT.

Bluespec SystemVerilog

Bluespec 

Arvind had developed the Bluespec language called Bluespec SystemVerilog (BSV), a high-level functional hardware description programming language which was essentially Haskell extended to handle chip design and electronic design automation in general. The main designer and implementor of Bluespec was Lennart Augustsson. Bluespec is partially evaluated (to convert the Haskell parts) and compiled to the term rewriting system (TRS). It comes with a SystemVerilog frontend. BSV is compiled to the Verilog RTL design files.

Tools 
BSV releases are shipped with the following hardware development kit:

 BSV compiler
 The compiler takes BSV source code as input and generates a hardware description for either Verilog or Bluesim as output. It was opensourced by Bluespec inc. in 2020 under New BSD License terms.
 Libraries
 BSV is shipped with a set programming idioms and hardware structures
 Verilog modules
 Several primitive BSV elements, such as FIFOs and registers, are expressed as Verilog primitives.
 Bluesim
 A cycle simulator for BSV designs.
 Bluetcl
 A collection of Tcl extensions, scripts, and packages to link into a Bluespec design.

References

"A History of Haskell: being lazy with class", Paul Hudak (Yale University), John Hughes (Chalmers University), Simon Peyton Jones (Microsoft Research), Philip Wadler (University of Edinburgh), The Third ACM SIGPLAN History of Programming Languages Conference (HOPL-III) San Diego, California, June 9–10, 2007.

External links
Bluespec homepage
Bluespec: User guide
An open-source Bluespec compiler from University of Cambridge
Equipment semiconductor companies
Companies established in 2003